The Science Society of China (1915-1960) was a major science organization in the modern history of China. It was initiated by Chinese students at Cornell University in 1914, including P.C. King, H. C. Zen, Zhou Ren, Hsingfo Yang and later renamed Science Society of China. In 1915 it began publication in China of a major journal, Kexue (Science), which was patterned on the journal of the American Association for the Advancement of Science. In 1918 Science Society of China founded headquarters in Nanjing. In 1922 the Society established a major biological research laboratory in Nanjing. The Society devoted itself to the popularization of science, the improvement of science education, the standardization in Chinese translation of scientific vocabularies, and participation in international scientific meetings. It was the leading scientific organization in China prior to the establishment of government-sponsored Academia Sinica (1928) and Chinese Academy of Sciences (1949).

See also
History of science and technology in the People's Republic of China
History of science and technology in China

References

External links
 Saving China through Science
 Jia Sheng, The Origins of the Science Society of China, 1914-1937, Cornell University Ph.D. dissertation in History, 1995
 Peter Buck, American Science and Modern China, Cambridge University Press, 1980 

Scientific societies based in China
1915 establishments in China
Organizations established in 1915